Jan Talesnikov (born December 11, 1972) is an Israeli retired footballer and current manager.

Early life
Talesnikov was born on 11 December 1972 in the Russian Republic of the Soviet Union, emigrating to Israel at the age of 7. He started playing football in the Youth Section of Maccabi Ironi Ashdod.

Playing career

Club
Talesnikov was promoted to the senior squad at Ashdod in 1990. Following relegation in 1995, he was transferred to Beitar Jerusalem in 1996, going on to win two league titles and the Toto Cup.

In 1999, Talesnikov joined Dundee United in the Scottish Premier League, before rejoining Beitar Jerusalem one year later. He signed for F.C. Ironi Ashdod in 2003, and then for Hapoel Jerusalem in 2005, before announcing his retirement in May 2007.

International
Talesnikov played international football for his adopted country of Israel. He made his debut in a friendly match against Turkey in 1998, scoring a goal. In total he played 21 games for Israel and scored 4 goals.

Coaching career
Before his retirement, Talesnikov began studying football coaching at the Wingate Institute. In 2007, he coached in the Israeli Beach Soccer League before being appointed as coach of the Beitar Jerusalem youth team in 2008.

In 2009, he was appointed assistant coach to Guy Azouri at Hapoel Be'er Sheva. After the resignation of Azouri, Talesnikov continued to assist his successor, Vico Haddad. In 2010, he was appointed director of the youth department of F.C. Ashdod, a position he held until his resignation in 2011.

In January 2012, Talesnikov was appointed assistant coach of Beitar Jerusalem. He left this job in June 2013. In September 2013 he was appointed assistant coach at the girls' football academy of the Israel Football Association.

Acting career

In 2005 Talesnikov finished his acting studies at the Camera Obscura School of Arts, and in 2006 graduated in screenwriting at the Sam Spiegel School. That same year, he played a supporting role in the film Little Heroes. He has also appeared in the TV series Champion and Love Anna.

Honours
 Israeli Premier League (2):
1996–97, 1997–98
 Toto Cup (1):
1997–98

See also
 1999–2000 Dundee United F.C. season

References

External links

1972 births
Living people
Soviet Jews
Israeli Jews
Israeli footballers
Israel international footballers
Israeli expatriate footballers
Maccabi Ironi Ashdod F.C. players
Beitar Jerusalem F.C. players
Dundee United F.C. players
F.C. Ashdod players
Hapoel Jerusalem F.C. players
Footballers from Ashdod
Expatriate footballers in Scotland
Israeli expatriate sportspeople in Scotland
Liga Leumit players
Israeli Premier League players
Scottish Premier League players
Soviet emigrants to Israel
Association football midfielders